"DNA" is a song by Australian electronic music duo Empire of the Sun. It was released as the second single from their second studio album, Ice on the Dune on 5 September 2013.

Track listing

Charts

Weekly charts

Year-end charts

References

Empire of the Sun (band) songs
2013 songs
Capitol Records singles
Songs written by Luke Steele (musician)
Songs written by Nick Littlemore
Songs written by John Hill (record producer)
Songs written by Peter Mayes